The 34th Luna Awards ceremony, presented by the Film Academy of the Philippines (FAP), honored the best Filipino films of 2015. It took place on September 18, 2016, at the Quezon City Sports Club in Quezon City, Philippines. Actor and director Rez Cortez hosted the show.

Winners and nominees

Awards 
Winners are listed first, highlighted in boldface.

Special Awards 
The following honorary awards were also awarded.
 Golden Reel Award – Vilma Santos-Recto
 Fernando Poe Jr. Lifetime Achievement Award – Emmanuel Borlaza
 Manuel de Leon Award for Exemplary Achievements – Herminio “Butch” Bautista
 Lamberto Avellana Memorial Award – Azucena “Nene” Vera Perez
 Plaque of Recognition – Jaclyn Jose

References

Luna Awards
2016 film awards